The 1912 New Hampshire gubernatorial election was held on November 5, 1912. Democratic nominee Samuel D. Felker defeated Republican nominee Franklin Worcester with 41.07% of the vote.

General election

Candidates
Major party candidates
Samuel D. Felker, Democratic
Franklin Worcester, Republican

Other candidates
Winston Churchill, Progressive
William H. Wilkins, Socialist
Alva H. Morrill, Prohibition

Results

References

1912
New Hampshire
Gubernatorial